Hanson v. Denckla, 357 U.S. 235 (1958), was a case decided by the Supreme Court of the United States regarding personal jurisdiction in the context of assets held in trust.

Factual background
A family trust was created by Mrs. Donner, who lived in Pennsylvania.  The trust was incorporated in Delaware, and a Delaware bank was the trustee.  Donner later changed her state of domicile upon moving to Florida where she eventually died.  The will was admitted to probate in Florida, and the court addressed the question of whether the Florida court or the Delaware trustee had jurisdiction over the trust.

Decision
The Court decided that the Florida court lacked jurisdiction based on the minimum contacts test that had developed over the course of several decades of Supreme Court Jurisprudence.  The trust company had no substantial business with Florida and no offices in Florida.  The only contact with Florida was the fact that Donner moved there, which was ruled insufficient to support jurisdiction.

See also
List of United States Supreme Court cases, volume 357
List of United States Supreme Court cases

References

External links
 

United States Supreme Court cases
1958 in United States case law
United States Supreme Court cases of the Warren Court